Galaxias longifundus, the West Gippsland galaxias, is a galaxiid of the genus Galaxias, a member of the Mountain Galaxias species complex group of freshwater fish, found in Australia.

Description
Length commonly , maximum recorded .  Similar to other members of the species complex.  Body long and relatively deep, the back is flattened forward of the pelvic fins.  Head medium sized, generally slightly shorter and distinctly wider than deep and wedge-shaped from the side.  Snout moderately long and bluntly rounded viewed from the side.

Fins have fleshy bases although the paired fins less so.  Fins rounded, anal and dorsal fins roughly the same length with the dorsal usually slightly longer.  Pelvic fins positioned approximately mid way along the body, pectoral fins paddle shaped.  Tail fin has distinctive flanges extending from across the caudal peduncle to nearly the end of the rays.

G.longifundud is mainly olive-brown across the back, head, snout, and the upper sides becoming light brown on the lower sides and cream on the belly.  This is overlaid with a pattern of dark spots and blotches and a faint band of gold speckles along the mid sides.  Gill cover is translucent with a small golden patch.  Fins are olive-grey and translucent.

Distribution

Not recorded downstream where introduced trout have colonised, or in adjacent catchments. Examination of museum specimens captured in the early twentieth century suggest this species may have been more widely distributed within the La Trobe system in the past, including perhaps, as far downstream as Traralgon.

Habitat
The stream where this species has been recorded is small  in average width and shallow  in average depth. The stream bottom is mostly boulder, cobble and pebbles with smaller areas of gravel, sand and clay. In-stream cover is provided mainly by rocks and lesser amounts of woody debris as well as overhanging banks and vegetation.

Lifecycle/Reproduction
Living its entire life in freshwater, unlike many other galaxias species this fish does not have a marine phase in its lifecycle.  Breeding season is unknown, but believed to be during spring.

Conservation
Critically endangered, protected under the Victorian Flora and Fauna Guarantee Act 1988.

Utility to humans
Not an angling target due to small size and conservation status.

References

Galaxias
Fish described in 2014
Taxa named by Tarmo Ain Raadik
Freshwater fish of Australia